is a Japanese luger. He competed at the 2014 Winter Olympics. He became interested in sliding sports during elementary school after seeing skeleton racer Kazuhiro Koshi on television.

References

External links
 

1990 births
Living people
Sportspeople from Sapporo
Japanese male lugers
Lugers at the 2014 Winter Olympics
Olympic lugers of Japan
21st-century Japanese people